The Department of Archaeology or DOA (estd 1953) is the primary organization for the archaeological research and protection of the cultural heritage under the government of Nepal.
After the April 2015 Nepal earthquake and May 2015 Nepal earthquake, the Department got involved with analyzing and reconstructing the ancient buildings in Nepal.

History
The Department of Archaeology has served under changing ministries since its establishment in 1953:

References

External links
 

Archaeology of Nepal
Government departments of Nepal
1953 establishments in Nepal